Chahar Bisheh-ye Olya (also Romanized as Chahar Bīsheh-ye ‘Olyā; also known as Chaha, Chahak, and Chaheh) is a village in Lishtar Rural District, in the Central District of Gachsaran County, Kohgiluyeh and Boyer-Ahmad Province, Iran. At the 2006 census, its population was 852, in 175 families.

References 

Populated places in Gachsaran County